Trindade (Portuguese for Trinity) may refer to:

Places

Brazil
Trindade, Rio de Janeiro
Trindade, Goiás
Trindade, Pernambuco
Trindade, Florianópolis, Santa Catarina, Florianópolis, Santa Catarina
Trindade (island), Espírito Santo

Portugal
Trindade (Beja), a parish in the municipality of Beja
Trindade (Vila Flor), a parish in the municipality of Vila Flor
Trindade station on the Porto Metro system

São Tomé and Príncipe
Trindade (São Tomé and Príncipe), a town and the capital of the Mé-Zóchi District

People
Armando Trindade (born 1927), Pakistani Catholic priest, 9th Bishop of Lahore
Rui Manuel Trindade Jordão, (1952) Angola born Portuguese international footballer
Manuel da Costa (footballer, born 1986) (1986) France born Portuguese footballer
Camila Trindade (1989) Brazilian model

Other uses
Trindade Atlético Clube, a Brazilian football (soccer) club
Trindade (water), a brand of bottled water from Cape Verde

See also
Trinidad
Trinidad (disambiguation)